General Crook (born General Columbus Crook, February 28, 1945, Mound Bayou, Mississippi, United States) is an American soul musician.

Crook was raised in Greenville, Mississippi, and moved to Chicago, Illinois, when he was 17. In 1969 he signed with Capitol Records, recording with an early version of Earth, Wind and Fire. His debut single, "In the Warmth of My Arms", appeared in 1969, followed by "When Love Leaves You Crying" in 1970. Neither sold well, and Capitol soon dropped Crook.

His 1970-71 releases for Down to Earth Records fared better; "Gimme Some" reached #22 on the US Billboard R&B chart in 1970, and "What Time It Is" peaked at #31 on the same chart the following year. He later recorded for Wand Records, including a full-length self-titled album in 1974. After the mid-1970s he was active primarily as a songwriter and record producer, principally with Syl Johnson and Willie Clayton.

References

1945 births
Living people
American soul musicians
American male singers
Record producers from Mississippi
Songwriters from Mississippi
Capitol Records artists
Singers from Mississippi
People from Greenville, Mississippi
People from Mound Bayou, Mississippi
American male songwriters